Soldiers of the Queen is the quarterly academic magazine of the Victorian Military Society. It covers many aspects of military and naval history of the Victorian and Edwardian eras, but with a strong emphasis on the armed forces of Great Britain and the British Empire, and the colonial wars of this period. The editor for many years was Roger Stearn, who remains the journal's reviews editor. The editor-in-chief is Andy Smith. The magazine is based in Newbury.

References

External links
 

Quarterly magazines published in the United Kingdom
English-language magazines
History magazines published in the United Kingdom
Military magazines published in the United Kingdom
Triannual magazines